Thomas Alexander Nagle was an Irish Labour Party politician. He was elected to Dáil Éireann as a Labour Party Teachta Dála (TD) for the Cork Mid, North, South, South East and West constituency at the 1922 general election. He was re-elected at the 1923 general election for the Cork North constituency. He lost his seat at the June 1927 general election, having stood in the Dublin South constituency.

References

Year of birth missing
Year of death missing
Labour Party (Ireland) TDs
Members of the 3rd Dáil
Members of the 4th Dáil
Politicians from County Cork
People of the Irish Civil War (Pro-Treaty side)